Erwin Casmir (2 December 1895 – 19 April 1982) was a German fencer. He won a silver medal at the 1928 Summer Olympics and two bronze medals at the 1936 Summer Olympics.

References

1895 births
1982 deaths
German male fencers
Olympic fencers of Germany
Fencers at the 1928 Summer Olympics
Fencers at the 1932 Summer Olympics
Fencers at the 1936 Summer Olympics
Olympic silver medalists for Germany
Olympic bronze medalists for Germany
Fencers from Berlin
Olympic medalists in fencing
Medalists at the 1928 Summer Olympics
Medalists at the 1936 Summer Olympics